Suzanne Mahlburg Kay (née Mahlburg) is the William & Katherine Snee Professor of Geological Sciences at Cornell University. She studies the origin and evolution of the continental crust. She is a Fellow of the Geological Society of America, the American Geophysical Union and the Mineralogical Society of America.

Early life and education 
Kay studied at the University of Illinois, earning a Master's degree in 1972. She completed her PhD at Brown University in mineralogy and petrology. She worked at University of California, Los Angeles as a postdoctoral fellow. Kay joined Cornell University as a postdoctoral researcher in 1976. She was a Fulbright Program Fellow at the University of Buenos Aires in 1989. She was promoted to Associate Professor in 1992 and Professor in 1999.

Research 
Kay studies the origin and evolution of the continental crust, looking at how regional tectonics are linked to magmatic processes. She investigates rocks and minerals using neutron activation analysis, inductively coupled plasma mass spectrometry, mass spectrometry and electron microscopes. She focuses on the Andean crust in central and South America. She has looked at the evolution of mid-tertiary magmatic rocks in the Andean subduction zone. She also investigates the Punta Altiplano.

Professional service 
She served as president of the Geological Society of America in 2013 to 2014, and the Mineralogical Society of America Dana Medal Committee between 2013 and 2015. Kay serves on the board of editors of the Journal of South American Earth Sciences. She is on the selection fellows committee of the American Geophysical Union.

Awards and honours 
2015 Member of the National Academy of Sciences of Argentina

2012 University of Illinois Geology Alumni Achievement Award 

2011 Fellow of the American Geophysical Union

2008 Fellow of the Mineralogical Society of America

2007 American Association of Petroleum Geologists Outstanding Educator Award

2000 Geological Society of America Distinguished Service Award

Books 
2009 Backbone of the Americas: Shallow Subduction, Plateau Uplift, and Ridge and Terrane Collision

2008 Field Trip Guides to the Backbone of the Americas in the Southern and Central Andes: Ridge Collision, Shallow Subduction, and Plateau Uplift

2006 Evolution of an Andean Margin: A Tectonic and Magmatic View from the Andes to the Neuquén Basin (35 Degrees-39 Degrees S Lat)

1990 Plutonism from Antarctica to Alaska

References 

Cornell University faculty
Year of birth missing (living people)
Living people
American geologists
University of Illinois alumni
Brown University alumni